Christian James Ronald Kitchen (born 23 June 1966) is a British trade union leader who has held the position of General Secretary of the National Union of Mineworkers (NUM) since 2007.

Prior to becoming NUM General Secretary, Kitchen was branch secretary at the Kellingley Colliery.

References

1966 births
Living people
British trade unionists
English miners
General Secretaries of the National Union of Mineworkers (Great Britain)